Dandrell Scott is an American actor, rapper, and voiceover artist. He is best known for his voiceover work with Wendy's, and their breakfast commercials starting in 2020. Scott began his VO career in 2018, voicing commercials for Walmart, Comcast, and Ford. While performing as a voiceover artist, Scott also landed roles in Chicago P.D. and the Chi. Scott's music aspirations followed, as he collaborated with hip hop artists such as Bun B and Sasha Go Hard. In 2020, Scott released his first studio single, "Faded 2nite," featuring Chicago rapper, Twista.

Early life 
Scott attended Thornton Township High School, in Harvey, Illinois and was on the Speech team with actor LaRoyce Hawkins. He participated in Illinois High School Association's Original Comedy event, placing first in the state event in the 2002-2003 year.
He graduated in 2003.

Career 
In 2016, Scott produced and voiced an animated short film entitled, Hard Knock Robots. The film was nominated for an Audience Choice Award at the 2016 Chicago International REEL Shorts Festival. In 2019, Scott made his television debut on the syndicated variety show, African American Short Films, for his comedic film, Try My Luck.

References

External links 
 
 Dandrell Scott on AllMusic

21st-century American musicians
Rappers from Chicago
Year of birth missing (living people)
Living people
American male voice actors